Potentilla longifolia is a plant species in the genus Potentilla found in Russia and Mongolia.

References

External links

longiflora
Plants described in 1816
Flora of Russia
Flora of Mongolia